WHKL (106.9 FM, "1069 Country Legends") is a radio station broadcasting a Classic Country music format. Licensed to Crenshaw, Mississippi, United States, the station is currently owned by J. Boyd Ingram and Carol B. Ingram.

References

External links

HKL